"Long Weekend" is the tenth episode of the first season of the American television drama series Mad Men. It was written by Bridget Bedard, Andre Jacquemetton, Maria Jacquemetton and series creator Matthew Weiner. The episode was directed by Tim Hunter and is set within the increasingly close 1960 United States presidential election, with TV commercials emphasising Kennedy's energy and Nixon's lack of leadership. The episode originally aired on the AMC channel in the United States on September 27, 2007.

Plot
Betty's father Gene comes to visit for Labor Day. Since the recent death of Betty's mother, Gene has found a new companion named Gloria, who Betty dislikes. As tensions increase, the three of them leave for their Labor Day weekend trip, with Don promising to join them the following day.

Roger tries to convince Joan to spend the evening with him, but she rejects him in favor of going out on the town with her roommate, Carol. Joan's roommate is distressed because she was fired from her publishing job when she was made the scapegoat for her boss's mistake. Joan and her roommate bond over their anger at being used by men. When Carol later expresses her love for Joan, and desire to be with her, Joan remains neutral and impassive.

Pete informs Don that one of his accounts, Dr. Scholl's, is leaving for another agency because of their dissatisfaction with creativity. Roger, still looking for companionship, offers to help take Don's mind off the lost client. They meet a pair of young twins at an ad audition for aluminum cladding, and Roger invites them upstairs for drinks. In the now-empty office, Roger propositions both girls, while Don seems uninterested in doing anything but going home. At the office, Roger suffers a major heart attack while attempting to have sex with one of the girls for a second time. He survives, but is hospitalized and cries as his wife and daughter visit. Don is shaken by the event and calls Betty but then visits Rachel seeking a sexual encounter.

Reception
The episode was received positively by critics at the time. Alan Sepinwall, writing for New Jersey's The Star-Ledger, praised the episode, saying that it and the show itself were "dense and layered" and "deserving of deeper analysis". Emily VanDerWerff, writing for The A.V. Club in 2014, was more critical of the episode, writing that the episode was "one of Mad Men's clunkier episodes" but she praised other aspects of the episode, including John Slattery's performance as Roger.

References

External links
"Long Weekend" at AMC

Mad Men (season 1) episodes
2007 American television episodes